Aripanthan is a village and panchayat halqa in Beerwah tehsil of Budgam district in the Indian union territory of Jammu and Kashmir. It is situated at the centre of tehsil Beerwah and tehsil Magam.

Geographical location 

Aripanthan is located between latitude 34.061°N and longitude 74.575°E at the base of Pir Panjal range. It is surrounded by plains to the north, east, south, and orchard hills from west. The landscape is made up of plateau-like terraces known as karewas.

Demography 

 India Census, Aripanthan has a total population of 5,268, out of which males are 2,739 and females are 2,529 in number. Total population in the age group of 0–6 years is 1,044, out of which males are 606 and females 438 in number. As of 2011 census Aripanthan has total 899 family residing. Number of literates as per census is 2772 out of which males are 1,636 and females 1136 in number. Total number of illiterates is 2,496, out of which males are 1,103 and females are 1,393 in number.

Overview 

Located between tehsil Beerwah and tehsil Magam, Aripanthan consists of 2 Panchayat Halqas Ari Panthan A and Ari Panthan B which fall under the administrative division of tehsil Beerwah. Aripanthan is further subdivided into three small villages viz; Hazarpora, Aripanthan and Warihama. Hazarpora is sub dived into two hamlets Boihama and Hazarrpora, Aripanthan is subdivided into six hamlets which include, Bonpora, Manzgam, Resraipora, Thesipora, Peer-Mohala and Hajam Mohalla. Warihama is subdivided into four mohallas which are, Thoker Mohalla, Danger Mohalla, Anar Kali Mohalla and Poiehaar Colony.

Religion 

People in all the three hamlets of Aripanthan follow Sunni Islam. Religious education is imparted through madrassas early in the morning. Moreover, several religious organizations, like Jamaat-e-Islami, Karwan-i-Islami, Dawat-e-Islami, Tehreek-e-Sawt ul Awliya and many others, impart the education of the Quran and Sunnah.

Transport 

Aripanthan is situated at the center of Beerwah, Magam and Khag. There is also a small taxi stand situated at Aripanthan, from which taxis can be hired to various locations like Khag, Tosamaidan, Beerwah, Budgam, Doodhpathri & Srinagar. Besides this taxi service is offered by the taxi stand to various areas, like Khag, Poshkar, Beerwah, Iskanderpora, Lolipora (Lalpora), Magam and Srinagar.

Infrastructure 

The Government Boys Secondary School is one of the oldest high school in the area imparting higher education to the common folks, thus Aripanthan enjoys a central position in educational field also. Besides this, other schools of Aripanthan are:
 Govt. Boys Secondary School Aripanthan
 Govt. Girls Middle School Aripanthan
 Al-Falah School Aripanthan
A large number of primary and lower primary are also operational in the area.
Recently an electric sub station of 6.3 Mva capacity has been sanctioned which is being constructed, which will improve the power scenario in and around Aripanthan.
JK bank small branch is functional in village, with an ATM also.

References 

Villages in Budgam district